The Ponghwa Art Theatre is a theatre located in Pyongyang, North Korea.

See also 
 List of theatres in North Korea

References 

Theatres in North Korea
Buildings and structures in Pyongyang